Jake Vincent (born 24 June 1989 in Solihull, West Midlands) is a British water polo player. At the 2012 Summer Olympics, he competed for the Great Britain men's national water polo team in the men's event. He is 6 ft 5.5 inches tall.

Career
He made his senior international debut in 2008, at the Presidents Cup. Before his Olympic squad call up, he was playing in Germany with SV Bayer Uerdingen 08 and was still there as of 2013. He was part of Great Britain's squad for the 2014 Euro Championship qualification campaign. He helped England to a gold medal in the 2014 Commonwealth Water Polo Championships.

In 2016, he was playing for Cheltenham. In 2018, he helped Solihull to the British League Division One title. He was called up to England's squad for a game against Scotland in 2018.

References

English male water polo players
1989 births
Olympic water polo players of Great Britain
Water polo players at the 2012 Summer Olympics
Living people
Sportspeople from Solihull